Malvoliophis pinguis, or the halfband snake-eel, is a species of eel in the family Ophichthidae. It is the only member of its genus. It is found in the western Pacific Ocean in the vicinity of Australia and Lord Howe Island.

References

Ophichthidae
Fish described in 1872
Taxa named by Albert Günther